"My All" is a song by American rapper Polo G, released on December 9, 2022, alongside a music video. It was produced by Southside, TooDope, Gara, Yung Swisher and CuBeatz.

Background
In January 2022, Polo G shared a snippet of the song on Instagram.

Composition
The song uses a "glossy" beat consisting of acoustic guitar. Lyrically, Polo G mourns about breaking up with a lover and discusses how it has changed his views on relationships, while also talking about having sex for enjoyment, spending money on jewelry, and losing friends to neighborhood violence.

Music video
The music video was directed by Cole Bennett. It sees Polo G sitting down and telling his story as re-enactments of his life, such as fighting with his girlfriend and attending a funeral of a friend, happen in the background.

Charts

References

2022 singles
2022 songs
Polo G songs
Columbia Records singles
Songs written by Polo G
Songs written by Southside (record producer)
Songs written by Kevin Gomringer
Songs written by Tim Gomringer
Song recordings produced by Southside (record producer)
Music videos directed by Cole Bennett